Round Pond is located in Ridgefield, Connecticut, USA. The pond drains across the state boundary to the state of New York into the Cross River Reservoir, providing an initial flow to New York City. Once used as a reservoir for city water for Ridgefield, the spring-fed aqueduct is no longer used for that purpose. A fishing ban enacted in the mid-19th century stands today, and the pond is no longer available for fishing.

References

Ponds of Connecticut
Ridgefield, Connecticut
Bodies of water of Fairfield County, Connecticut